Samir Jabrayilov (born 7 September 1994 in Cherkasy) is a Ukrainian-born Azerbaijani cyclist, who last rode for UCI Continental team .

Major results

2013
 1st  Road race, National Road Championships
 1st Stage 5 Jelajah Malaysia
2014
 National Road Championships
2nd Time trial
3rd Road race
 5th Tour of Yancheng Coastal Wetlands
2015
 National Road Championships
1st  Under-23 time trial
1st  Under-23 road race
3rd Time trial
3rd Road race
2016
 National Road Championships
2nd Road race
3rd Time trial
 2nd Grand Prix of ISD
 3rd Horizon Park Race for Peace
 4th Overall Tour of Ukraine
1st  Young rider classification
 5th Grand Prix of Vinnytsia
2017
 3rd Time trial, National Road Championships
 8th Horizon Park Classic
2018
 2nd Road race, National Road Championships
 2nd Grand Prix Side
 9th Overall Tour of Mediterrennean
2019
 National Road Championships
2nd Road race
2nd Time trial
 2nd Overall Tour of Black Sea
 4th Grand Prix Velo Erciyes
 5th Overall Tour of Mevlana
 10th Race Horizon Park Classic
2021
 National Road Championships
2nd Road race
2nd Time trial

References

External links

1994 births
Living people
Azerbaijani male cyclists
European Games competitors for Azerbaijan
Cyclists at the 2015 European Games
Cyclists at the 2019 European Games